William John Watson FRSE LLD (1865 – 9 March 1948) was a toponymist, one of the greatest Scottish scholars of the 20th century, and was the first scholar to place the study of Scottish place names on a firm linguistic basis.

Life 

Watson was a native Gaelic-speaker, born in Milntown of New Tarbat (now known as Milton), Easter Ross. He was the son of Hugh Watson, a blacksmith. He received his initial education from his uncle, James Watson. William became well grounded in Gaelic studies and the Classics. He went to study at the University of Aberdeen and the University of Oxford.

Initially a school teacher in Glasgow, he was appointed Rector of the Royal Academy, Inverness in 1894 and he then obtained the prestigious post as Rector of the Royal High School, Edinburgh, in 1909. It was while teaching in Inverness that he began to contribute to the Transactions of the Gaelic Society of Inverness and the Celtic Review.

In Edinburgh he lived at 17 Merchiston Avenue.

In 1910 he was elected a Fellow of the Royal Society of Edinburgh. His proposers were Walter Biggar Blaikie, Sir William Leslie Mackenzie, John Horne and Ben Peach.

He took the chair of Celtic at the University of Edinburgh in 1914, despite holding no prior university position. He remained in this prestigious position until making way for his son James Carmichael Watson in 1935 (but retaining a role in the university until 1938).

William died on 9 March 1948, aged 83.

Family 
He married Ella Carmichael (1880–1928), daughter of Alexander Carmichael.

His son, James Carmichael Watson, was born in 1910. He was declared "missing in action" in 1942, when HMS Jaguar was sunk off the coast of Egypt. Presumed drowned, he is memorialised on the Plymouth Naval Memorial.

Publications 
He is known for his The Celtic Place-names of Scotland (1926), based on 30 years of work. Watson's work, eight decades later, is still the primary scholarly reference guide on the subject. The book is based on extensive notes taken by Watson, which are unpublished and held by the University of Edinburgh. Watson's great work was recently republished by Birlinn (2004).
 Place-Names of Ross and Cromarty (Inverness, 1904)
 Prints of the Past around Inverness (Inverness, 1909; 2nd revised edition Inverness, 1925)
 Rosg Gàidhlig (Inverness, 1915; 2nd edition Glasgow, 1929)
 Bàrdachd Gàidhlig (Inverness, 1915)
 The Picts: their original position in Scotland (Inverness, 1921)
 
 The History of the Celtic Place-Names of Scotland (Edinburgh, 1926)
 Scottish Verse in the Book of the Dean of Lismore (Edinburgh, 1937)

References

Further reading 
 Savage, Steve, William J Watson: Scottish Place-Name Papers, (London, 2002)
 Watson, W. J., History of the Celtic Place-Names of Scotland, (Edinburgh, 1926), reprinted, with an Introduction, full Watson bibliography and corrigenda by Simon Taylor (Edinburgh, 2004).

External links 

1865 births
1948 deaths
Celtic studies scholars
People from Ross and Cromarty
Scottish Gaelic language
Toponymists
Academics of the University of Edinburgh